Lars Ahlin (4 April 1915 – 11 March 1997) was a Swedish author and aesthetician.

Biography
Ahlin left school when he was 13 to support his family, although he later attended several folk high schools. When he was 18, he had a mystical experience.  He eventually moved to Stockholm, where he wrote two unpublished novels before his first success, Tåbb med manifestet (Tåbb with the Manifesto, 1943). The story, about a young proletarian who rejects the values of communism in favor of a secularized Lutheran theology where man is judged by his deeds, without preconceived notions, set the stage for his subsequent works.  Critics have compared Ahlin to Fyodor Dostoyevsky and Thomas Mann. Among the awards he received are the Prize of the Nine in 1960, the Great Novel Prize in 1962, and the Small Nobel Prize in 1966. In 1995, he won the Swedish Academy Nordic Prize, known as the 'little Nobel'.

Notable works
Tåbb med manifestet, 1943
No Eyes Await Me (story collection), 1944
Min död är min (My Death Is My Own), 1945
Om (If, About, Around), 1946
Kanelbiten (The Cinnamon Girl), 1953
The Great Amnesia, 1954
Natt i marknadstältet (Night in the Market Tent), 1957
Bark and Leaves, 1961
Sjätte munnen (The Sixth Mouth), 1985
De sotarna! De sotarna! (The Chimney Sweepers! The Chimney Sweepers!), 1991

References
"Ahlin, Lars", Academic American Encyclopedia, 1991 edition, p. 198.
"Ahlin, Lars".  Encyclopædia Britannica.  Encyclopædia Britannica 2007 Ultimate Reference Suite.  Chicago: Encyclopædia Britannica, 2007.

1915 births
1997 deaths
People from Sundsvall
Swedish male writers
Writers from Medelpad
Selma Lagerlöf Prize winners
Dobloug Prize winners